= Mindanao Pulse =

- Type: Weekly newspaper
- Format: Broadsheet
- Publisher: Elmer Yaun
- Editor-in-chief: Elmer Yaun
- Editor: Loremie Cadiatan
- Founded: 2002
- Language: English
- Headquarters: Davao City
- Price: P 8.00

The Mindanao Pulse is published every Tuesday with business and editorial office located at Tinikling St., Dimson Compound, Lanzona Subd., Matina, Davao City.
